Remorse, a Story of the Red Plague is a 1917 Australian silent film about a naive country boy who visits the big city and contracts syphilis. The movie is now considered a lost film.

Plot
Jack Rundle (Cyril Mackay) works on a station and falls in love with Nellie Fallon, his father's ward, Nellie Fallon (Mabel Dyson). When he goes to the city on business he falls into bad company, contracts syphilis and returns home to find himself an outcast. Years later he finds his brother Ted has married Nellie. He then kills himself.

Production
The film was shot in Adelaide, using pupils from Mathews' acting school.

Release
There was some doubt over whether the movie would be released. But the South Australian censor passed it because they regarded it as having a moral message, although children under sixteen were not admitted. Public response was very strong.

The film was originally banned in New South Wales by the censor but this was overturned on appeal.

Cast
Cyril Mackay as Jack Rundle
Mabel Dyson as Nellie Fallon
Ida Gresham
Marie D’Alton
C.R. Stanford
Victor Fitzherbert
Claude Burton

References

External links
 
 Remorse, a Story of the Red Plague at National Film and Sound Archive

Australian black-and-white films
Lost Australian films
1917 films
1917 drama films
Australian drama films
Australian silent feature films
Films shot in Adelaide
1917 lost films
Lost drama films
Silent drama films
1910s English-language films